Essien Udim is one of the Annang speaking Local Government Areas in Akwa Ibom State, Nigeria.

It was created out of the former Ikot Ekpene division and included the following clans in Annang land: Afaha Clan, Adiasim Clan, Odoro Ikot Clan, Ekpeyong Atai Clan, Ikpe Annang Clan, Okon Clan, Ukana Clan, Ukana East Clan. Essien Udim LGA has an expected populace of 79,444 occupants with most of the area's general population being individuals from the Affang ethnic sub-division. The Affang language is broadly spoken nearby while Christianity is the most polished religion in the LGA. Milestones in Essien Udim LGA remember the Sunshine Battery Industry for Ukana Ikot Ide and the Akan Ikot Okoro conversion.

History 
Historically, it was the most populated area among the Annang Land with its headquarters in Afaha Ikot Ebak. Currently, created  in the year 1989 from the Ikot Ekpene LGA. its chairman is Mr. Anthony Udoh Luke. In Ikpe Annang there are fourteen villages which are:Ibam, Ikot Akpan, Ikot Ntuen, Nnung Iyang, Udok, Mbia Obong, Mbiabet, Ikot Ekpe, Ikot Eside, Ebe, Ikot Abiat, Ekpeno Oton, Onion Ono, Ekoi. and the smallest village among them is Ikpe Ekoi and the largest among is Mbiabet. In Okon there are eighteen villages which includes: Ikot Idem Udo, Ikot Oko, Ikot Essien, Ikot Uke Etor, Ikot Nya, Ikot Ama, Ikot Igwe, Ikot Ekefre, Ikot Ekpenyong, Ikot Ocho, Ikot Udo Okure, Ikpe Okon, Ifa Okon, Umon, Nji, Ufuku, Nto Okpo and Nto Ubiam. Which afaha ikot ebak is the headquarters. Ikpe Udok being one of the smallest villages in essien udim.
The ikpe Udok village is governed by Chief Etim Udoekong which is his fourth year in seat.

The A342 highway crosses the east and the north of the LGA.

Geography 
Essien Udim LGA observes two significant seasons; the dry and the blustery seasons while the normal temperature of the area is 25 °C. The absolute yearly precipitation in Essien Udim LGA 3550 mm while the normal humidity of the area is 86 percent. Essien Udim LGA consists of a few streams and feeders.

Economy 
Essien Udim LGA is wealthy in raw petroleum and flammable gas and as such the region has a few nearby and unfamiliar oil organizations. Fishing is likewise an exceptionally well known endeavor in Essien Udim LGA with the area's streams and feeders being wealthy in fish. Other significant financial commitment in Essien Udim LGA incorporate cultivating, exchange, making of blocks and pottery, making of raffia bins, caps and mats, and the creation of fishing nets and kayaks. Crops filled in Essien Udim LGA incorporate oil palm, cassava, and elastic while the business sectors in the space incorporate the Obo Annang market.

References

Local Government Areas in Akwa Ibom State